Gun Dughdi (also Romanized as Gūn Dūghdī and Gūndūghdī) is a village in Sahandabad Rural District, Tekmeh Dash District, Bostanabad County, East Azerbaijan Province, Iran. At the 2006 census, its population was 189, in 39 families.

References 

Populated places in Bostanabad County